The 1898 Virginia Orange and Blue football team represented the University of Virginia as an independent during the 1898 college football season. Led by first-year head coach   Joseph Massie, the team compiled a record of 6–5. The Orange and Blue defeated Vanderbilt at Louisville in the South's most anticipated game. The team's captain was Harris T. Collier.

Schedule

Coaching staff
 Head coach: Joseph Massie
 Assistant coach: Arlie C. Jones
 Other assistants: Robert H. Mudd, Saunders Taylor, Porter Parker, Mike Johnson.

References

Virginia
Virginia Cavaliers football seasons
Virginia Orange and Blue football